Anisopodus elongatus is a species of beetle in the family Cerambycidae that was described by Henry Walter Bates in 1863.

This species is brown with white spots on the back, with antennae that face back around the body and extend past it. It has black spots where the antenna attaches to the head.

References

Anisopodus
Beetles described in 1863